LaFayette Lionel Duckett (February 19, 1918 – January 16, 2018) was an American politician. He served as a Democratic member in the Texas House of Representatives from 1941 to 1947, representing Wharton County. He focused on banking and taxation law.

Duckett died on January 16, 2018, one month before his 100th birthday.

References

1918 births
2018 deaths
Members of the Texas House of Representatives
People from Fayette County, Texas